Untitled Film Still #21 is a black and white photograph taken by Cindy Sherman in 1978. It is part of her Untitled Film Stills photographic series, taken from 1977 to 1980. This photo was sold at auction for $871,500 in 2017. This picture is also known as The City Girl, because in this photo Sherman is posing as a Hitchcock-inspired "working woman" on the streets of a big city.

Evaluation
Nicholas Mirzoeff used this image in a chapter of his work "How to See the World",  explicitly discussing the way of self-expression from self-portrait to selfie. For Mirzoeff, the woman in the photo stares in an invisible direction, and the feeling of opening her lips creates a "sense of threat and anxiety". He pointed out that in the classic Hollywood screen setting, "victims are always isolated like this before they suffer violence." However, Sherman's expression can also show that nothing is more vital than mild uncertainty. So anxious, but "threatening" feels like too much projection.

Legacy
Untitled Film Still #21 is one of her acclaimed early photos, and the style and architectural style of the costume (more "brighter" than the viewer originally saw it in 1978) is an integral part of its lasting appeal as a single photo.

Public collections
There are prints of this photograph at the Museum of Contemporary Art, in Los Angeles, the Museum of Contemporary Art, in Chicago, the Metropolitan Museum of Art and the Museum of Modern Art, in New York.

References

See also
Classical Hollywood cinema
Film noir
Stock character

1978 in art
1970s photographs
Photographs by Cindy Sherman
Black-and-white photographs
Photographs of the Metropolitan Museum of Art
Photographs of the Museum of Modern Art (New York City)